Dépas is a village in the Côteaux commune of the Côteaux Arrondissement, in the Sud department of Haiti.

See also
Côteaux
Lan Beurte

References

Populated places in Sud (department)